The  is a commuter electric multiple unit type operated by Nagoya Railroad (Meitetsu) in Japan since 1976. In the narrow sense of the word, the 6000 series is the type produced from 1976, but in the broad sense, it includes later series, namely the 6500 series, and the 6800 series.

6000 series 
The 6000 series began service in 1976.

In 1977, the series won the Blue Ribbon Award for outstanding design by the Japan Railfan Club.

By 1984, 140 cars had been manufactured.

6500 series 
By 1984, it had become apparent that the 6000 series needed to be expanded. However, at this time, a design change was considered. At this time, regenerative braking via field choppers had started to become commonplace as a proven technology. 

The first sets appeared in 1984. 

The sixth batch of the series featured a complete remodel of the cab exterior.

6800 series 
The 6800 series began appearing in 1987 as an upgraded 2-car version of the 6000 series.

Sets constructed from 1989 onwards featured updated bodywork.

By 1991, 39 2-car trains had been constructed.

References

External links
 
 
 

Electric multiple units of Japan
6000 series
Train-related introductions in 1976

Nippon Sharyo multiple units
1500 V DC multiple units of Japan